Adel Gholami (born 9 February 1986 in Amol) is a volleyball player from Iran, who plays as a middle blocker for the Iran men's national team and the club Haraz Amol. Gholami competed at the Rio 2016 Summer Olympics.

Career

National team
He was invited to national team in 2008. Gholami playing in two World Championship 2010, 2014. They won the gold medals at the  Asian Volleyball Championship and the 2014 Asian Games.

Clubs
Adel Gholami started playing volleyball in Amol. He started his career in his hometown volleyball club Abfa Amol. He has played for Narenjestan Noor, Sanam Tehran, Paykan Tehran, Pegah Urmia and Saipa. In a remarkable display of Saipa and Pegah game made. Gholami later joined Kalleh. In 2012, he was captain of the team and its luster with the Kalleh reached the winner Asian Championship. He is a four time gold medal winner in Iranian Super League.

Honours

National team
Asian Championship
Gold medal (1): 2013
Silver medal (1): 2009
Asian Games
Gold medal (1): 2014
Silver medal (1): 2010

Club
Asian Championship
Gold medal (4): 2013 (Kalleh), 2016, 2017 (Sarmayeh Bank), 2018 (Khatam Ardakan)
Iranian Super League
Champions (4): 2012, 2013 (Kalleh), 2016, 2017 (Sarmayeh Bank)

Individual
Best Blocker: 2010 Asian Games
Best Blocker: 2012 Asian Club Championship
Best Blocker: 2018 Asian Club Championship

References

External links

FIVB profile

1986 births
Living people
People from Amol
Iranian men's volleyball players
Asian Games gold medalists for Iran
Asian Games silver medalists for Iran
Asian Games medalists in volleyball
Olympic volleyball players of Iran
Volleyball players at the 2016 Summer Olympics
Volleyball players at the 2010 Asian Games
Volleyball players at the 2014 Asian Games
Medalists at the 2010 Asian Games
Medalists at the 2014 Asian Games
Sportspeople from Mazandaran province
21st-century Iranian people